Pawgammm is a genus of ground beetles in the family Carabidae. This genus has a single species, Pawgammm rougemonti.

References

Platyninae